Munday may refer to:

People
 Munday (Hampshire cricketer), 18th-century English cricketer 
 Anthony Munday (1560–1633), English dramatist
 Don Munday (1890–1950), Canadian explorer, naturalist and mountaineer 
 David Mundy (born 1986), Australian rules footballer
 Dorian Carl Munday (born 1941) British composer
 Herbert Munday (1876–1961), English footballer
 Jim Munday (born 1917), Australian rules footballer 
 John Mundy (composer) (c.1550–1630), English Renaissance composer
 Kade Munday (born 1983), Australian cricketer 
 Michael Munday (born 1984), English cricketer
 Mickey Munday, the last surviving member of the Miami-based drug gang called the "Cocaine Cowboys" 
 Pat Munday, American environmentalist and writer
 Phyllis Munday (1894–1990), Canadian mountaineer 
 Richard Burnard Munday (1896-1932), World War I flying ace
 Richard Munday (c.1685–1739), colonial American architect and builder

Places
 Munday, Texas, USA
 Munday, West Virginia, USA
 Munday Island, Tasmania, Australia

Other uses
 15576 Munday, asteroid

See also
 Monday
 Mundy (disambiguation)